Made in Italy is a merchandise mark indicating that a product is all planned, manufactured and packed in Italy, especially concerning the design, fashion, food, manufacturing, craftsmanship, and engineering industries.

History

Made in Italy brand has been used since 1980 to indicate the international uniqueness of Italy in four traditional industries: fashion, food, furniture and mechanical engineering (automobiles, industrial design, machineries and shipbuilding), in Italian also known as "Four A", Abbigliamento (clothes), Agroalimentare (food), Arredamento (furniture) and Automobili (automobiles). Italian products have often been associated with quality, high specialization and differentiation, elegance, and strong links to experienced and famous Italian industrial districts often connected with the concept of luxury. Since 1999, Made in Italy has begun to be protected by associations such as Istituto per la Tutela dei Produttori Italiani (Institute for the Protection of the Italian Manufacturers) and regulated by the Gucci company to the Italian government.

In recent times the merchandise mark Made in Italy has become decisive for Italian exports and so common worldwide to be often considered as a separate product category. In January 2014, Google Cultural Institute, in collaboration with the Italian government and the Italian Chamber of Commerce, launched an online project aimed to promote Made in Italy by using virtual showrooms about several famous Italian products.

Regulation
In 2009, the Italian law 135 stated that only products totally made in Italy (planning, manufacturing and packaging) are allowed to use the labels Made in Italy, 100% Made in Italy, 100% Italia,  in every language, with or without the flag of Italy. Each abuse is punished by the Italian law.

Compared with "Made in Germany" ('all essential manufacturing steps') and "Made in the USA" ('all or virtually all'), Italian regulation is more restrictive ('totally') in determining what qualifies for the use of the "Made in Italy" label.

Brands

Economists and business analysts have identified five companies in particular whose names are closely associated with Made in Italy:
Barilla - food company;
Benetton - global fashion brand;
Ferrero - manufacturer of chocolate and other confectionery products;
Indesit - 	home appliances;
Luxottica - the world's largest eyewear company.

Fashion and accessories

Armani
Berluti
Bontoni
Bottega Veneta
Breil
Brioni
Brunello Cucinelli
Buccellati
Bulgari
Calzedonia
Canali
Cerruti 1881
Cesare Attolini
Cesare Paciotti
Corneliani
Damiani
Diesel
Dolce & Gabbana
E. Marinella
Emilio Pucci
Etro
Fendi 
Fiorucci
Gas Jeans
Geox 
Gucci
Harmont & Blaine
Intimissimi
Kiton
Larusmiani
Lardini
Loro Piana
Marzotto
Max Mara
Missoni
Miu Miu
Moncler
Moschino
Officine Panerai
Pal Zileri
Persol
Piquadro
Prada
Rifle
Roberto Cavalli
Rubinacci
Safilo
Salvatore Ferragamo
Stefano Ricci
Trussardi
Valentino 
Versace 
Zegna

Foods and beverages

Acqua Minerale San Benedetto
Amedei
Auricchio
Autogrill
Averna 
Amaro Lucano 
Balocco
Berlucchi
Buitoni
Caffarel
Campari
Carapelli
Cirio
De Cecco
Eataly
Ferrari Trento
F.lli Garcia
Giovanni Rana
Granarolo
Illy
La Molisana
Lavazza
Lazzaroni
Loacker
Martini & Rossi
Massimo Zanetti
Parmalat
Perfetti Van Melle
Perugina
Saclà Italia
San Carlo
San Pellegrino
Vicenzi
Voiello

Furnitures and home appliances

Alessi
Alivar
Artemide
Bertazzoni
Bialetti
B&B Italia
Brionvega
Bticino
Candy
Cassina
De'Longhi
Flexform
Flou
Indesit Company
Jacuzzi
Molinari
Natuzzi
Poltrona Frau
Prandina
Scavolini
Smeg
Tacchini
Tonelli
Valcucine
Zanussi

Engineering

Abarth
Alfa Romeo
Aprilia
Atala
Axis Group Yacht Design
Azimut Yachts
Benelli Armi SpA
Benelli
Benetti
Bertone
Bianchi Bicycles
Bravo
Brembo
Campagnolo
Cantiere Navale Visentini
Carpigiani
Carraro Agritalia
Carrozzeria Castagna
Carrozzeria Ghia
Carrozzeria Marazzi
Carrozzeria Touring
Cimbali
Colnago
Custom Line
Danieli
De Rosa
De Simon
De Tomaso
Dell'Orto
Di Blasi Industriale
Ducati
Fabio Perini S.p.A.
Ferrari
Ferretti Group
Fiat
Filippi Boats
Fioravanti
Franco Tosi Meccanica (FTM)
Ghia
Giannini Automobili
I.DE.A Institute
Italdesign Giugiaro
Leonardo
Lamborghini
Lancia
Maire Tecnimont
Maserati
MER MEC
Moto Guzzi
MV Agusta
Officine Meccaniche Giovanni Cerutti
Permasteelisa
PFM Group
Pinarello
Piaggio
Pininfarina
Pirelli
Riva Yachts
Silca S.p.A.
Sonus Faber
Toscotec
VM Motori
Zagato
Lasting Dynamics

See also
 General Confederation of Italian Industry

References

External links
Italian Trade Agency

Italy
Business in Italy